Organ Music Not Vibraphone Like I'd Hoped is the first full-length album released by musician Spencer Krug under his Moonface moniker. It is the follow-up to the 2010 EP Dreamland EP: Marimba and Shit-Drums and was released on August 2, 2011.

Track listing
All songs written by Spencer Krug.

 "Return to the Violence of the Ocean Floor" - 7:17
 "Whale Song (Song Instead of a Kiss)" - 8:04
 "Fast Peter" - 8:03
 "Shit-Hawk in the Snow" - 7:29
 "Loose Heart = Loose Plan" - 6:39

References

External links
 Official Album Page at Jagjaguwar

2011 albums
Spencer Krug albums